Robert Humphries (4 July 1933 – 1988) was an English professional footballer who played as a right half or inside forward in the Football League for Brighton & Hove Albion and Millwall.

Life and career
Humphries was born in Hindhead, Surrey, in 1933. He was on the books of Tottenham Hotspur as an amateur and then played for Sussex County League club Eastbourne United. After a month's trial with First Division club Sheffield United, he signed professional forms in February 1956. He never made a league appearance, and moved on later that same year to Brighton & Hove Albion, for whom he made his debut in the Football League in November. Humphries made ten appearances in the Third Division South for Albion, scoring twice, before joining another third-tier club, Millwall. After three years and 47 league appearances, he returned to non-league football with Hastings United, Cambridge United, a return to Hastings, where he was a member of the team promoted to the Southern League Premier Division in 1962–63, Tunbridge Wells Rangers and Bognor Regis Town, where he acted as player-manager. Humphries died in a car accident in Spain in 1988 at the age of 54.

References

1933 births
1988 deaths
People from Hindhead
English footballers
Association football wing halves
Association football inside forwards
Tottenham Hotspur F.C. players
Eastbourne United F.C. players
Sheffield United F.C. players
Brighton & Hove Albion F.C. players
Millwall F.C. players
Hastings United F.C. (1948) players
Cambridge United F.C. players
Tunbridge Wells F.C. players
Bognor Regis Town F.C. players
English Football League players
Southern Football League players
English football managers
Bognor Regis Town F.C. managers